Achryson surinamum is a species of longhorn beetle in the Cerambycinae subfamily. It was described by Carl Linnaeus in his 1767 12th edition of Systema Naturae. It is known from southwestern United States, Argentina, Baja California, and the West Indies.

References

Achrysonini
Beetles described in 1767
Taxa named by Carl Linnaeus